</noinclude>

Anton Vladimirovich Antonov-Ovseenko (23 February 1920, Moscow, RSFSR – 9 July 2013, Moscow, Russia) was a Russian historian and writer.

Born on 23 February 1920, he was the son of the Bolshevik military leader Vladimir Antonov-Ovseenko who commanded the assault on the Winter Palace. In 1935, he joined the historical faculty of the Moscow State Pedagogical Institute. In 1938, he was expelled from Komsomol and the institute wherein, however, he was reinstated in the same year.

He was arrested in 1940 and spent 13 years in labor camps.

Antonov-Ovseenko is best known for his biography of Lavrentiy Beria and  he also wrote several books.

Antonov-Ovseenko operated a state museum on the Gulag, for which the Moscow administration provided a building in August 2001.

When he died in 2013, he was still working two full days a week to continue documenting what he called "the evils of the Soviet era" and to help with plans for a new, larger space.

Bibliography
The Time of Stalin: Portrait of a Tyranny, Harper & Row, 1981,  (reprinted 1983)
Theater of Joseph Stalin Moscow. "Grėgori-Pėĭdzh", 1995. 
Enemy of the people, Moscow. Intellekt, 1996. Russian text online
Beria Moscow, ACT, 1999,   (PDF of the 2007 edition online)
Naprasnyi podvig? (Vain feat?) Moscow: ACT, 2003.

References

External links

Anton Antonov Ovseyenko, Who Exposed Stalin Terror, Dies at 93 New York Times, July 10, 2013

1920 births
2013 deaths
Moscow State Pedagogical University alumni
20th-century Russian historians
Stalinism-era scholars and writers
Russian political writers
21st-century Russian historians
Journalists from Moscow
Soviet dissidents
Gulag detainees
Burials at Novodevichy Cemetery
Soviet historians